Cymbidium elegans, the elegant cymbidium, is an orchid species in the genus Cymbidium found in South West China.

References

External links
 

elegans
Endemic orchids of China
Plants described in 1833